Heart pain (also referred to as cardialgia or cardiodynia) is a general expression for any heart-related sensation of pain, and may in particular refer to:
 Angina, insufficient blood flow to the heart muscles causing chest pain
 Broken heart, a metaphor for the intense stress or pain one feels at experiencing great longing
 Chest pain, pain in any region of the chest, generally considered a medical emergency
 Heart attack, lack of blood flow to part of the heart causing damage to the heart muscles
 Heartburn, a burning sensation in the central chest or upper central abdomen caused by gastric acid
 Psychological pain, an unpleasant feeling of a psychological, non-physical origin

See also 
 Broken heart (disambiguation)
 Heart (disambiguation)
 Pain in My Heart